Syagrus calcaratus is a species of leaf beetle. It is distributed in Guinea, the Democratic Republic of the Congo, Senegal, Nigeria, Ghana, Sudan and Ivory Coast. It was first described by Johan Christian Fabricius in 1775.

Syagrus calcaratus is a pest of cotton. The larvae attack the roots of the plant and cause it to wilt. Other host plants for the species include Parinari curatellifolia.

References

Eumolpinae
Beetles of Africa
Beetles of the Democratic Republic of the Congo
Insects of West Africa
Insects of Sudan
Taxa named by Johan Christian Fabricius
Beetles described in 1775